Umeboshi Rock is a rock exposure 4 miles (6 km) east-northeast of Akebono Rock on the coast of Queen Maud Land. Mapped from surveys and air photos by the Japanese Antarctic Research Expedition (JARE), 1957–1962, and named Umebushi-iwa (rumpled rock).

See also
Kani Rock, a rock exposure between Umeboshi Rock and Chijire Rocks

References

External links
 

Rock formations of Queen Maud Land
Prince Olav Coast